Thief River Falls Public Schools is a school district headquartered in the School District Service Center in Thief River Falls, Minnesota.

Schools
 Lincoln High School
 Franklin Middle School
 Challenger Elementary School

References

External links
 Thief River Falls Public Schools
School districts in Minnesota
Education in Pennington County, Minnesota